Kent County is a county located in the U.S. state of Rhode Island. As of the 2020 census, the population was 170,363, making it the second-most populous county in Rhode Island. The county was formed in 1750 from the southern third of Providence County. It was named after the county of Kent, England. Kent County, like other counties in Rhode Island, no longer has governmental functions (other than as court administrative and sheriff corrections boundaries). Kent County is included in the Providence-Warwick, RI-MA Metropolitan Statistical Area, which in turn constitutes a portion of the greater Boston-Worcester-Providence, MA-RI-NH-CT Combined Statistical Area.

Geography

Adjacent counties
 Providence County - north
 Bristol County - east
 Washington County - south
 New London County, Connecticut - southwest
 Windham County, Connecticut - west
 Newport County - southeast

Major highways

Demographics

2000 census
As of the census of 2000, there were 167,090 people, 67,320 households, and 44,969 families living in the county. The racial makeup of the county was 95.54% White, 0.93% Black or African American, 0.23% Native American, 1.34% Asian, 0.02% Pacific Islander, 0.65% from other races, and 1.28% from two or more races.  1.69% of the population were Hispanic or Latino of any race. 20.1% were of Italian, 18.9% Irish, 11.1% English, 10.1% French, 6.1% French Canadian and 6.1% Portuguese ancestry, 92.0% spoke English, 1.9% Spanish, 1.5% French, 1.4% Portuguese and 1.1% Italian as their first language.

There were 67,320 households, out of which 29.90% had children under the age of 18 living with them, 52.70% were married couples living together, 10.50% had a female householder with no husband present, and 33.20% were non-families. 27.60% of all households were made up of individuals, and 11.40% had someone living alone who was 65 years of age or older.  The average household size was 2.45 and the average family size was 3.02.

In the county, the population was spread out, with 23.20% under the age of 18, 7.00% from 18 to 24, 30.50% from 25 to 44, 24.20% from 45 to 64, and 15.10% who were 65 years of age or older.  The median age was 39 years. For every 100 females, there were 92.30 males.  For every 100 females age 18 and over, there were 88.70 males.

The median income for a household in the county was $47,617, and the median income for a family was $57,491. Males had a median income of $40,052 versus $29,130 for females. The per capita income for the county was $23,833.  About 4.80% of families and 6.60% of the population were below the poverty line, including 7.90% of those under age 18 and 8.10% of those age 65 or over.

2010 census
As of the 2010 United States Census, there were 166,158 people, 68,645 households, and 43,747 families living in the county. The racial makeup of the county was 93.4% white, 2.0% Asian, 1.4% black or African American, 0.3% American Indian, 1.0% from other races, and 1.8% from two or more races. Those of Hispanic or Latino origin made up 3.2% of the population. The largest ancestry groups were:

 26.7% Irish

 23.2% Italian

 17.3% English

 16.3% French

 8.9% Portuguese

 7.6% German

 4.8% Polish

 4.4% French Canadian

 3.3% American

 2.9% Swedish

 2.4% Scottish

 1.7% Scotch-Irish

 1.4% Russian 

Of the 68,645 households, 28.7% had children under the age of 18 living with them, 48.1% were married couples living together, 11.1% had a female householder with no husband present, 36.3% were non-families, and 29.2% of all households were made up of individuals. The average household size was 2.40 and the average family size was 2.98. The median age was 42.7 years.

The median income for a household in the county was $61,088 and the median income for a family was $77,100. Males had a median income of $53,458 versus $41,380 for females. The per capita income for the county was $31,221. About 4.9% of families and 7.9% of the population were below the poverty line, including 9.5% of those under age 18 and 8.6% of those age 65 or over.

Communities

City
 Warwick

Towns
 Coventry
 East Greenwich (traditional county seat)
 West Greenwich
 West Warwick

Census-designated place
 Greene

Other villages

 Anthony
 Arkwright
 Blackrock
 Coventry Centre
 Crompton
 Fairbanks
 Harris
 Hillsgrove
 Hopkins Hollow
 Nooseneck
 Lippitt
 Quidnick
 Spring Lake
 Summit
 Tiogue
 Washington
 Whaley's Hollow

Politics
Kent County, like most of Rhode Island, has been strongly Democratic for the last half century. In 2016, Donald Trump became the first Republican to win the county since Ronald Reagan in 1984, though Joe Biden was able to bring it back over to the Democratic side four years later in 2020. 

 

|}

See also
 National Register of Historic Places listings in Kent County, Rhode Island

References

 
1750 establishments in Rhode Island
Populated places established in 1750
Providence metropolitan area
Counties in Greater Boston